The Lower North Water Bridge is a road bridge north of Montrose, Scotland. It carries the A92 over the River North Esk. It is situated on the border between Angus and Aberdeenshire. It is adjacent to the North Water Viaduct which previously carried the Montrose and Bervie Railway and is now a footpath.

It is a Category A listed building.

History 
The bridge was constructed from 1770 to 1775. John Adam, John Smeaton, and Andrew Barrie of Montrose worked on the project. The bridge was formerly tolled, and a ruined octagonal toll house remains standing.

In 2008, the bridge underwent a £700,000 restoration.

References 

Former toll bridges in Scotland
Bridges completed in 1775
1775 establishments in Scotland
Category A listed buildings in Aberdeenshire
Category A listed buildings in Angus, Scotland